Solanderia ericopsis is a hydroid in the family Solanderiidae, the group commonly known as tree hydroids or sea fan hydroids. S. ericopsis forms very large, conspicuous colonies from 5 to 50 cm in height, which are often noted by divers. They are usually strictly fan-shaped but can sometimes be bushy.

The colonies can be unusually long-lived: during long-term monitoring of defined rock areas around the Poor Knights Islands, one researcher observed a single colony of S. ericopsis over fifteen years, during which it reached 50 cm in height.

Distribution

Solanderia ericopsis is found only in New Zealand, all around the country but mostly in the North Island; it can occur in rather shallow water, at depths ranging from 2 to 200 metres.

References

Solanderiidae
Animals described in 1873
Invertebrates of New Zealand